is a Japanese professional baseball Infielder for the Fukuoka SoftBank Hawks of Nippon Professional Baseball (NPB).

In 2022, he set the Western League record for most home runs in a season.

Professional career
On October 26, 2017, Sunagawa was drafted as a developmental player by the Fukuoka SoftBank Hawks in the 2017 Nippon Professional Baseball draft.

In the 2018–2019 season, he played in informal matches against the Shikoku Island League Plus's teams and amateur baseball teams, and played in the Western League of NPB's second leagues.

On March 16, 2020, Sunagawa re-signed a 6 million yen contract with the Fukuoka SoftBank Hawks as a registered player under control. On December 17, he was honored for the Western League Home Run Leader Award, the Western League RBI Leader Award and the Western League Outstanding Player Award at the NPB Awards 2020.

September 2, 2021, Sunagawa made his first league debut in the Pacific League against the Tohoku Rakuten Golden Eagles. And he recorded his first hit on September 4 against the Orix Buffaloes. He also hit his first homer the next day against the Buffaloes on the 5th with a reverse grand slam and drove in six runs. He finished his debut season with a .181 batting average, seven home runs and 20 runs batted in in 34 games.

In the 2022 season, managers and coaches had high hopes for him to become a solid starting player, but he finished the regular season with a .159 batting average, three home runs, and five runs batted in. On the other hand, in the Western League, he hit 29 home runs, the most in league history.

Personal life
Sunagawa is of partial American descent and, according to teammate Carter Stewart, "speaks pretty good English."

References

External links

 Career statistics - NPB.jp
 52 Richard Sunagawa PLAYERS2022 - Fukuoka SoftBank Hawks Official site

1999 births
Living people
Fukuoka SoftBank Hawks players
Japanese baseball players
Nippon Professional Baseball infielders
Baseball people from Okinawa Prefecture
Japanese people of American descent
Gigantes de Carolina players